Stih & Schnock is a Berlin-based artist duo, formed by Renata Stih, a professor at the Berlin University of Applied Sciences and chair of Berlin's art in public space advisory commission, and Frieder Schnock, a former curator at the Museum Fridericianum in Kassel and head of education at Berlin's artists association. Their works deal primarily with collective memory in society. The Holocaust is a recurring reference for their artistic interventions.

Stih & Schnock are frequent lecturers and visiting professors primarily in the United States. Their works have been exhibited at the Staatsgalerie Stuttgart, the Museum of Art Fort Lauderdale, the Jewish Museum of New York, the Museum London (Ontario)], the Saint Louis Art Museum, and the Boca Raton Museum of Art.

In 2015 Stih & Schnock were honored as Distinguished Service Awardees by the Obermayer German Jewish History Awards.

Select list of works 
 2015–16: Rosie Won the War (Women at the homefront in the U.S. during World War II)
 2011: Time Islands (Nelson-Mandela-School, Berlin-Wilmersdorf)
 2008: Show Your Collection
 2006–7: The City as Text—Jewish Munich
 2005: Sarajevo - Living On
 2005: Rosa I, Rosa II, Rosa III (Rosa Luxemburg Memorial Project, Berlin-Mitte)
 1994–95: Bus Stop (project for the Holocaust Memorial in Berlin)
 1992–93: Places of Remembrance (Memorial in the Bavarian Quarter, Berlin-Schöneberg)

References 

 Sebastian Preuss, Archaeologies of Meaning, in: Show Your Collection, Verlag der Kunst Nürnberg, 2008
 James E. Young, At Memory's Edge: After-images of the Holocaust in Contemporary Art and Architecture (Yale University Press, 2000)

External links 
 Website of Stih & Schnock
 Mention in the New York Review of Books
 Mention in the New Yorker
 Mention in the L.A. Times
 Mention in the New York Times
Press release, New York University, 22 January 2019

Art duos
German artists